Phostria temira is a moth in the family Crambidae. It was described by Caspar Stoll in 1781. It is found in Suriname, Costa Rica, Panama and Mexico.

References

Phostria
Moths of Central America
Moths of South America
Taxa named by Caspar Stoll
Moths described in 1781